Abraham de Jesús "Abramo" Conyedo Ruano (born 7 October 1993) is a Cuban-born freestyle wrestler representing Italy. He is a bronze medalist at the World Wrestling Championships and the European Wrestling Championships. He represented Italy at the 2020 Summer Olympics in Tokyo, Japan, winning a bronze medal in Men's freestyle 97 kg.

Career 

In 2018, he won one of the bronze medals in the men's 97 kg event at the World Wrestling Championships held in Budapest, Hungary. In 2020, he won one of the bronze medals in the 97 kg event at the European Wrestling Championships held in Rome, Italy.

In March 2021, he competed at the European Qualification Tournament in Budapest, Hungary, qualifying for the 2020 Summer Olympics in Tokyo, Japan. A month later, he competed in the 97 kg event at the 2021 European Wrestling Championships in Warsaw, Poland where he was eliminated in his first match.

In 2022, he lost his bronze medal match in the 125 kg event at the European Wrestling Championships held in Budapest, Hungary. He won the silver medal in the 125 kg event at the 2022 Mediterranean Games held in Oran, Algeria.

Achievements

References

External links 

 
 
 

1993 births
Living people
People from Santa Clara, Cuba
Italian male sport wrestlers
Wrestlers at the 2010 Summer Youth Olympics
European Wrestling Championships medalists
World Wrestling Championships medalists
Italian people of Cuban descent
Olympic wrestlers of Italy
Wrestlers at the 2020 Summer Olympics
Medalists at the 2020 Summer Olympics
Olympic bronze medalists for Italy
Olympic medalists in wrestling
Mediterranean Games silver medalists for Italy
Mediterranean Games medalists in wrestling
Competitors at the 2022 Mediterranean Games
20th-century Italian people
21st-century Italian people